Hygrophorus pudorinus, commonly known as the blushing waxycap or turpentine waxycap, is a species of fungus in the genus Hygrophorus.

Swedish mycologist Elias Magnus Fries described it as Agaricus pudorinus in his 1821 work Systema Mycologicum. It became Hygrophorus pudorinus with the raising of Hygrophorus to genus rank. The species name is the Latin word pudorinus "blushing".

The species is classified in the subsection Pudorini of genus Hygrophorus, along with the closely related species H. erubescens and H. purpurascens.

The fruit body (mushroom) is a fair size, with a  diameter pink to golden convex cap with a downrolled margin that is lighter in colour. The cap surface is sticky. The pink to yellow-white gills are decurrent. The spore print is white and the oval spores measure 7–10 × 5–6 micrometres. The thick flesh is pale pink or orange to white. The mushroom does not bruise red and has no distinctive odour, though it can taste like turpentine.

Hygrophorus pudorinus is found in coniferous woodlands under fir and spruce trees across western and northeastern North America; it is particularly common in Canada and the Rocky Mountains. The mushrooms appear in groups or fairy rings in late summer and autumn. They often grow in boggy places in sphagnum moss.

Despite its taste, it is edible after cooking. Its variable appearance makes identification difficult and hence raises risk of misidentification.

References

pudorinus
Fungi of Europe
Fungi of North America
Edible fungi
Fungi described in 1821
Taxa named by Elias Magnus Fries